The first season of Survival Audition K-pop Star premiered on December 4, 2011, airing every Sunday evening at 6:30 pm under the Good Sunday programming block on SBS, until April 29, 2012. The first winner was Park Ji-min, who chose to sign with JYP Entertainment.

The three judges for this season were Yang Hyun-suk, founder of YG Entertainment and former member of the popular South Korean act Seo Taiji & Boys, Park Jin-young, singer/songwriter and founder of JYP Entertainment, and Korean pop icon BoA, from SM Entertainment.

Singer, Yoon Do-hyun, and entertainer, Boom, hosted the live competition from March 4, 2012 to April 29, 2012 when the winner is crowned. Yoon Do-hyun has also been narrating through the entire process.

Contestants from the Top 10 of Season 1 returned for a special Dream Stage - Best of the Best episode on April 14, 2013, competing with contestants of Season 2 for the title of Overall Champion.

Process 

Audition applications + Preliminary auditions (July – October 2011)
Preliminary auditions were held from around the world in countries such as China, United States, and Brazil. Auditions were also held in Europe.
First round: Talent Audition – Check for talents and skills (Airdate: December 4–18, 2011)
Second round: Contact Audition + Ranking Audition – Audition and help with a chosen judge, and ranking by judges (Airdate: December 18, 2011 - January 1, 2012)
Third round: Casting Audition – Being cast by one of three companies for a two-week training session (Airdate: January 8 - February 5, 2012)
Fourth round: Battle Audition – Competing for a spot in the Top 10 to advance to the live competition (Airdate: February 12–26, 2012)
Fifth round: Stage Audition – Judges score and viewers voting during live competition to decide the final winner (Airdate: March 4 - April 29, 2012)

Judges 
Yang Hyun-suk : YG Entertainment CEO, producer, singer
Park Jin-young : JYP Entertainment Executive producer, singer, songwriter
BoA : SM Entertainment singer, songwriter, dancer, record producer

Top 10
 Park Ji-min : Born 1997, from Daejeon, Winner, debuted in duo 15& under JYP Entertainment, now under Warner Music Korea as Jamie
 Lee Ha-yi : Born 1996, from Bucheon, Runner-up, debuted as soloist LEE HI under YG Entertainment but left in 2019, now under AOMG
 Baek A-yeon : Born 1993, from Seongnam, eliminated April 22, 2012 (8th Live), debuted as soloist under JYP Entertainment, currently under Eden Entertainment
 Lee Seung-hoon : Born 1992, from Busan, eliminated April 15, 2012 (7th Live), debuted in boy group WINNER under YG Entertainment
 Lee Michelle : Born 1991, from Paju, eliminated April 8, 2012 (6th Live), debuted as a soloist under DIMA Entertainment
 Park Jae-hyung : Born 1992, from United States, eliminated April 1, 2012 (5th Live), debuted in band DAY6 under JYP Entertainment
 Yoon Hyun-sang : Born 1994, from Suwon, eliminated March 25, 2012 (4th Live), debuted as soloist under LOEN Entertainment
 Baek Ji-woong : Born 1990, from Seoul, eliminated March 18, 2012 (3rd Live), debuted as a soloist under Bob Film Entertainment
 Kim Na-yoon : Born 1994, from United States, eliminated March 11, 2012 (2nd Live), signed with Starship Entertainment  and left to pursue her bachelor's degree at Boston University
 Lee Jung-mi : Born 1996, from Ilsan, eliminated March 4, 2012 (1st Live), had been signed but cancelled her contract with YG Entertainment

Round 5: Stage Auditions 
 The Top 10 competes on the live stage with the results determined by combining the Judges Score 60%, Viewers SMS Vote 30%, and Advance Online Vote 10%.

Ratings 
In the ratings below, the highest rating for the show will in be red, and the lowest rating for the show will be in blue. (Note: Individual corner ratings do not include commercial time, which regular ratings include.)

References

External links 
  
  

 
2010 South Korean television series debuts